Borzęcino  is a village in the administrative district of Gmina Barwice, within Szczecinek County, West Pomeranian Voivodeship, in north-western Poland.

Notable residents
 Karl Decker (1897–1945)

References

Villages in Szczecinek County